Elaphrothrips is a genus of tube-tailed thrips in the family Phlaeothripidae. There are at least 40 described species in Elaphrothrips.

Species
These 40 species belong to the genus Elaphrothrips:

 Elaphrothrips acanthomerus Hood
 Elaphrothrips achaetus Bagnall
 Elaphrothrips armatus (Hood, 1908)
 Elaphrothrips athletes (Karny, 1923)
 Elaphrothrips aztecus Hood
 Elaphrothrips bilineatus Priesner, 1933
 Elaphrothrips blatchleyi Hood, 1938
 Elaphrothrips borgmeieri Hood
 Elaphrothrips capensis Faure
 Elaphrothrips coniferarum (Pergande, 1896)
 Elaphrothrips costalimai Hood
 Elaphrothrips dampfi Hood
 Elaphrothrips defectus Hood
 Elaphrothrips edouardi Jacot-Guillarmod
 Elaphrothrips falcatus Karny, 1912
 Elaphrothrips faurei Jacot-Guillarmod
 Elaphrothrips flavipes (Hood, 1908)
 Elaphrothrips imitator Priesner, 1935
 Elaphrothrips indagator Hood
 Elaphrothrips jacotguillarmodi Johansen, 1979
 Elaphrothrips macateei Hood
 Elaphrothrips medius Hartwig
 Elaphrothrips mucronatus Priesner
 Elaphrothrips niger Jacot-Guillarmod
 Elaphrothrips nigripes Jacot-Guillarmod
 Elaphrothrips orangiae Jacot-Guillarmod
 Elaphrothrips parallelus Hood, 1924
 Elaphrothrips peruviensis Hood
 Elaphrothrips powelli Jacot-Guillarmod
 Elaphrothrips prospector Hood
 Elaphrothrips schoutedeni Priesner
 Elaphrothrips sensitivus
 Elaphrothrips snodgrassi Hood
 Elaphrothrips spiniceps Bagnall, 1932
 Elaphrothrips sumbanus Priesner
 Elaphrothrips tener Priesner, 1925
 Elaphrothrips tuberculatus (Hood, 1908)
 Elaphrothrips valerioi Retana & Soto, 2002
 Elaphrothrips vittipennis Hood, 1940
 Elaphrothrips zetetis Hood

References

Further reading

 
 
 
 
 
 

Phlaeothripidae
Articles created by Qbugbot